Crenshaw station is a elevated light rail station on the C Line of the Los Angeles Metro Rail system. It is located in the median of Interstate 105 (Century Freeway), above Crenshaw Boulevard, after which the station is named, in the city of Hawthorne, California.

The station is not named for the Crenshaw neighborhood of Los Angeles, which is located several miles north of this station, and is served by K Line.

The original name for the station was Crenshaw Blvd/I-105, but was later simplified to just Crenshaw.

The stories on the tiled walls in street-level plaza were collected and organized by Buzz Spector in an artwork entitled "Crenshaw Stories."

Service

Station layout

Hours and frequency

Connections 
, the following connections are available:
 Torrance Transit: 10X

References

C Line (Los Angeles Metro) stations
Railway stations in the United States opened in 1995
Hawthorne, California
Crenshaw, Los Angeles
Inglewood, California
1995 establishments in California